Expansion Team is the second album from West Coast hip hop group Dilated Peoples. The release is widely considered the group's best album, led by the hit rap single "Worst Comes to Worst", sampled from William Bell's "I Forgot to Be Your Lover". Expansion Team features production from Dilated members Evidence and Babu, as well as popular underground rap producers DJ Premier, The Alchemist, Da Beatminerz, Questlove of The Roots and JuJu of The Beatnuts. Album guests include Guru of Gang Starr, Black Thought of The Roots, Tha Alkaholiks and Beat Junkies members J-Rocc, Rhettmatic and Melo-D.

Track listing

Album singles

Music videos
Gang Starr and The Alchemist with Dilated Peoples in "Worst Comes to Worst"Released: 2001

Charts

References

2001 albums
Dilated Peoples albums
Albums produced by DJ Premier
Albums produced by Da Beatminerz
Albums produced by the Alchemist (musician)
Albums produced by Questlove
Albums produced by Evidence (musician)
Capitol Records albums